Ingrid Camilla Claussen (born  in Trondheim, also known as Camilla Claussen) is a Norwegian female curler and coach.

As a head coach of Norwegian wheelchair curling team she participated in 2006 Winter Paralympics, where Norwegian team finished on fourth place.

Teams and events

Record as a coach of national teams

References

External links

Untitled - Idrettsrådet i Trondheim (look at page 1, "Ingrid C Claussen, Trondheim Curlingklubb")
Ingrid Camilla Claussen - Thermal Energy - SINTEF Energy Research - SINTEF

Living people
1974 births
Sportspeople from Trondheim
Norwegian female curlers
Norwegian curling coaches